Konrad Albert Reuland (April 4, 1987 – December 12, 2016) was an American football tight end who played in the National Football League (NFL). He attended the University of Notre Dame, and later went to Stanford University. Undrafted out of college, he signed with the San Francisco 49ers in 2011, and was also a member of the New York Jets, Indianapolis Colts, and Baltimore Ravens.

High school and college
Konrad Albert Reuland was born in Springfield, Ohio, the son of Canadian-born Ralf Volker Reuland and Illinois-born Mary Arlene Reuland (née Puchalski). Reuland attended Mater Dei High School in Santa Ana, California, helping their basketball team to reach the California Interscholastic Federation Southern Section and state championships as a freshman in 2003. Before his sophomore year, he transferred to Mission Viejo High School in Mission Viejo, California, and played for their gridiron football team. With Reuland, Mission Viejo had a 39–2 win–loss record. He also continued playing basketball for Mission Viejo, and graduated in 2006.

Reuland enrolled at the University of Notre Dame to play college football for the Notre Dame Fighting Irish in 2006 and 2007. He transferred to Stanford University in 2008, and sat out for the season according to transfer rules. In 2009, he appeared in 13 games for the Stanford Cardinal, catching six passes for 142 yards. Reuland recorded 21 receptions for 209 yards with Stanford in 2010.

Professional career
Reuland signed as an undrafted free agent with the San Francisco 49ers in 2011. The 49ers kept Reuland on their practice squad for the 2011 season. Reuland was claimed off waivers by the New York Jets on September 1, 2012. During the 2012 season, Reuland had 11 receptions for 83 yards, the longest for 18. He was placed on the injured reserve list with a knee injury on November 19, 2013. Reuland signed with the Indianapolis Colts on October 21, 2014. He was released on October 30.

The Baltimore Ravens signed Reuland to their practice squad on November 12, 2014. On September 5, 2015, he was released by the Ravens. He signed with the Ravens' practice squad the following day, and was released on September 8. On October 13, 2015, the Ravens re-signed Reuland to the practice squad. On November 4, 2015, Reuland was released. On November 18, he was re-signed to the practice squad. On December 8, the Ravens promoted Reuland to the active roster after Crockett Gillmore and Maxx Williams went down with injuries and Nick Boyle was suspended for the remainder of the season. On July 31, 2016, Reuland was signed by the Colts. He played in three preseason games for the Colts, making one catch for ten yards. He was released on August 29.

Personal life
Reuland was a close friend of NFL quarterback Mark Sanchez. The two had known each other since elementary school, and were high school football teammates at Mission Viejo in addition to later being NFL teammates on the Jets.

Death
Reuland suffered a brain aneurysm on November 28, 2016, and underwent surgery the following day. He died on December 12 at the UCLA Medical Center. His heart and one of his kidneys were donated and transplanted into MLB Hall of Fame player Rod Carew. His other kidney and liver were donated and transplanted  into two other people.

See also
List of American football players who died during their career

References

External links
Stanford Cardinal bio

1987 births
2016 deaths
Sportspeople from Springfield, Ohio
Players of American football from California
Players of American football from Ohio
American football tight ends
Notre Dame Fighting Irish football players
Stanford Cardinal football players
San Francisco 49ers players
Sportspeople from Mission Viejo, California
New York Jets players
Indianapolis Colts players
Baltimore Ravens players
Deaths from intracranial aneurysm
Organ transplant donors